The 2020 Stock Car Brasil Championship was the forty-second season of the Stock Car Brasil. From 2020 Toyota Gazoo Racing entered in the series.

Changes

Technical regulations 

 For 2020 Toyota Gazoo Racing entered alongside Chevrolet. The make developed ten Toyota Corolla Stock Car.
 Chevrolet Cruze and Toyota Corolla models were used in 2020 configuration. They were adapted to Stock Car components such as suspension, brake, gear and some other items of current cars.

Teams and drivers

Team changes 

Cimed Racing announced the departure as a team of the championship after seven seasons and two titles. Customer team in 2019 Crown Racing will expand to four cars. The team also announced an alliance with Shell V-Power Racing that left TMG Racing. After the end of partnership, TMG announced a new partner with Blau Motorsport in 2020. The new team, which will be formed by the union of the two structures. After one year of partnership Full Time Sports and Shell broke up and FTS will take on four cars.

Prati-Donaduzzi breaks up with R.Mattheis Motorsport and leaves Stock Car. The team will return to the original name.

Hot Car Competições scaled back to a single car operations and Carlos Alves Competições, who competed part-time last season, will not return.

Toyota Gazoo Racing Brasil will compete with eight cars. The teams selected was Full Time Sports with four cars; RCM and Ipiranga Racing.

Drivers changes 

Atila Abreu and Ricardo Zonta left TMG Racing and Galid Osman and Gaetano di Mauro left Full Time Sports. Abreu and Osman will be part of Crown Racing; Zonta joined RCM and Di Mauro entered Vogel.

Felipe Fraga left the series after six season and one title to focus on his international career. He will be part of Mercedes-Benz GT programme.

Gabriel Casagrande moved from Crown Racing to R. Mattheis. 2019 drivers Júlio Campos and Valdeno Brito didn't advertise 2020 plans. Later, Campos signed with Crown Racing for replaced Casagrande and Brito joined Copa Truck championship.

Argentine racing driver, Matias Rossi joined Toyota Full Time. Piquet Jr. was relocated to the customer team alongside Rafael Suzuki, who moved from Hot Car Competições.

Race calendar and Results 
The calendar suffered a lot of changes due to the COVID-19 pandemic.

Championship standings 
Points system
Points are awarded for each race at an event to the driver/s of a car that completed at least 75% of the race distance and was running at the completion of the race.

Feature races Used for the first race of each event.
Sprint races:The second race of each event, with partially reversed (top ten) grid.
Final race: Used for the last round of the season with double points.

Drivers' Championship

Notes

References 

Stock Car Brasil seasons
Stock Car Brasil
Stock Car Brasil